George Adams Shuford (September 5, 1895 – December 8, 1962) was a U.S. Representative from North Carolina.

Born in Asheville, North Carolina, Shuford attended the public schools and the University of North Carolina 1913-1915.
He graduated from the University of Georgia at Athens in 1917. He was admitted to the Georgia bar in 1917. During the First World War entered the first officers' training camp at Fort McPherson, Georgia, in May 1917. He was commissioned a second lieutenant in August 1917 and assigned to the 119th Infantry Regiment of the 30th Infantry Division. He became a first lieutenant in January 1918 and served in the United States and France. He was discharged at Camp Jackson, South Carolina, April 28, 1919. He was admitted to the North Carolina bar in August 1920 and commenced practice in Asheville, North Carolina. He served as chairman of Buncombe County board of elections from 1940 to 1942. He served in the North Carolina House of Representatives from 1945 to 1947. He served as a state superior court judge from 1947 to 1949.

Shuford was elected as a Democrat to the Eighty-third, Eighty-fourth, and Eighty-fifth Congresses (January 3, 1953 – January 3, 1959), during which time he was a signatory to the 1956 Southern Manifesto that opposed the desegregation of public schools ordered by the Supreme Court in Brown v. Board of Education.. He was renominated for the Eighty-sixth Congress but later withdrew because of ill health, and resumed the practice of law.
He resided in Asheville, North Carolina, until his death there on December 8, 1962. He was interred in Riverside Cemetery.

Sources

External links

 

1895 births
1962 deaths
United States Army officers
Politicians from Asheville, North Carolina
Democratic Party members of the United States House of Representatives from North Carolina
Democratic Party members of the North Carolina House of Representatives
North Carolina state court judges
20th-century American judges
20th-century American politicians
American segregationists